Lake Arthur High School (LAHS) is a grade 7-12 junior and senior high school in unincorporated Jefferson Davis Parish, Louisiana, United States, near Lake Arthur.

Athletics
Lake Arthur High athletics competes in the LHSAA.

References

External links
 Lake Arthur High School

Public high schools in Louisiana
Public middle schools in Louisiana
Schools in Jefferson Davis Parish, Louisiana